Isla del Rey is one of the islands that are part of the archipelago of Chafarinas, along with the Isla del Congreso and the Isla de Isabel II. It is one of the Plazas de soberanía, located in the Mediterranean Sea, to the north of Africa. Currently, they are administered by the Ministry of Defence of Spain.

References

Plazas de soberanía
Uninhabited islands of Spain
Isla del Rey (Chafarinas)